Kim Hyeong-seok (born September 27, 1966) is a composer in South Korea who is known for producing both dance music and ballads. Since beginning his career in 1989, Kim has composed or produced more than 1,000 songs and has worked with many of the top Korean performers. In 1994 he helped JYP get started with his first album and is credited as a composer on IU's album REAL.

Kim is also known for producing soundtracks for movies and TV, such as for the film My Sassy Girl.

Kim appeared on multiple TV shows including as a producer in Season 2 of Sister's Slam Dunk and as a celebrity judge in Season 1 of A Battle of One Voice: 300. In 2018, Kim performed two piano pieces in Pyongyang at a joint concert between South and North Korea.

Kim received the KBS Music Awards composer award in 1997 and 2002 and the SBS Music Awards composer award in 1998.

Filmography

Television show

References

South Korean composers
1966 births
Living people